Alex Eugene Newell (born August 20, 1992) is an American actor and singer. They are known for their role as Unique Adams on the Fox musical series Glee and Mo on Zoey's Extraordinary Playlist. Newell also starred as Asaka in the Broadway revival of Once on This Island at the Circle in the Square Theater in 2018. As a singer, Newell has released tracks with Clean Bandit, Blonde, and The Knocks.

Early life
Newell was born on August 20, 1992, in Lynn, Massachusetts. Their father, a deacon, died of cancer when they were six years old, at which point their mother raised them as a single parent.

After four complete years of education in the first class of Kipp Lynn Academy, Newell moved on to and graduated from Bishop Fenwick High School in 2012, where they were involved in their school's choir, improv club, and costume club; they were also a member of their church choir. They never had any formal voice lessons before landing their part on Glee. They have cited Donna Summer, Sylvester, Diana Ross, Aretha Franklin, Chaka Khan, and Beyoncé as their influences.

Career

2010–14: Glee
Newell was among 34,000 to submit an audition video in 2011 for the first season of Oxygen's The Glee Project. Newell's self-taped audition earned them over one million MySpace views as well as a spot among the 12 participants who competed for a seven-episode arc on Glee. During the arc, they asserted themself as an out gay man. Eventually, they became the series’ first runner-up. Nevertheless, the producers were so impressed that they decided to bring them on Glee for two episodes. Newell first appeared on Glee in the third season episode "Saturday Night Glee-ver". They were cast in the role of Wade "Unique" Adams, a transgender teenager who was assigned male at birth. The shy, outcast Wade expressed their female identity through music as the bold, brave alter ego, Unique. Wade broke ground by being one of the most visible transgender characters on television and one of the first on a network prime time show. Newell's performance was described as "bold", with "remarkable restraint and powerful vocals."

On his nightly show, Bill O'Reilly expressed concern that children watching the show unsupervised might be encouraged to experiment with what he termed "alternative lifestyles," which he said the show glorified. Newell commented, "My mother said, 'If Bill O'Reilly said something about you, you are doing something right.' He just showed the public and conservative viewers me. There are more people seeing me now... There are people like Wade and Unique, and [they're] being themselves. If kids want to go and do that, that is them expressing who they are." They later appeared in two more episodes and completed their story arc that season.

Newell was accepted into the Berklee College of Music for fall 2012, but  decided instead to move to Los Angeles to be on Glee when they were asked to rejoin the cast for the show's fourth season. Unique returned as a Glee recurring cast member in the fourth season premiere, "The New Rachel". Newell, along with the rest of the cast, received a nomination for a Screen Actors Guild Award for Outstanding Performance by an Ensemble in a Comedy Series in 2012, but lost to Modern Family. For the fifth season, Newell was promoted to main cast because of the character's popularity. In the sixth and final season, Newell was not a part of the regular cast, but  did appear as a recurring guest star. A highlight of the sixth season was Newell singing "I Know Where I've Been" from Hairspray with the Transpersons Choir of 200 performers.

2014–16: Music career and Power EP
Over the years, Newell sang at numerous events, such as the Coachella Festival, but also at many LGBT events and pride festivals. They also performed at the Governors Ball Music Festival and BBC Radio 1's Big Weekend.

Newell announced in October 2013 that they had been signed by Big Beat Records and that they were going to release Newell's debut album. It was also revealed that it was going to be produced by Adam Anders. Their debut single, a cover of Sigma's "Nobody to Love", was released on June 3, 2014.

In 2015, Newell embarked on a series of cover songs and collaborations. In March, they provided feature vocals for the re-issued version of "Stronger", a song by Clean Bandit. Later in the same month, they produced a disco-house stylization of Robin S.'s single "Show Me Love" together with Russian DJ Matvey Emerson. Over the summer, they worked with the British electro duo Blonde by featuring vocals in their single "All Cried Out". They then began to collaborate with the US electroduo The Knocks on the song "Collect My Love", "a soaring disco standout" where they reached "staggering heights." The song, from the EP So Classic, will be included in The Knocks' debut album 55, scheduled to be released in March 2016. Finally, for Christmas, Newell released a cover of the song "O Come All Ye Faithful".

Their original song "This Ain't Over", released in January 2016, was warmly welcomed by the media. Out commented: "The vibrant dance-pop track flawlessly revives disco if only for a few short minutes. Without the gimmicks of manufactured radio pop, Newell manages to serve This Ain't Over with pure talent." Spin said: "Newell's unassailable voice is in full force on 'This Ain't Over,' shining out like a triumphant beacon over a thumping, glamorous dance-pop soundscape." Vulture concluded: "This is just diva vocal acrobatics flexed with the swag of a queen."

"This Ain't Over" was announced as the first track off their debut extended play called Power, featuring production from the pop artists Diane Warren, Nile Rodgers, MNEK and DJ Cassidy. The EP will be released on February 19 via Big Beat.

Newell supported fellow Glee alum Adam Lambert on tour from February 23 until the April 2 finale at Los Angeles’ Orpheum Theatre in 2016. After the tour, Newell recorded a new single in collaboration with Power producers DJ Cassidy and Nile Rodgers, entitled "Kill the Lights", released on April 8, 2016, through Atlantic Records. It was expected to be one of a few tracks that Newell was making as part of the HBO TV series Vinyl. It was later revealed that the song had been recorded the previous year when Newell was working with Clean Bandit, Blonde and The Knocks, and inspired the producers to work with them on their debut extended play. Later that same month, the song was released again, featuring vocals from Jess Glynne.

2016–present: Debut album, Once on This Island, and Zoey's Extraordinary Playlist
After the success and the release of Newell's debut extended play Power and their tour with Adam Lambert, Newell headed back in the studio. On June 3, 2016, they released their first single outside of their recent project, entitled "Need Somebody". It was exclusively released onto iTunes and Apple Music on June 3 and released onto other platforms several days later. Also, the earnings from its first week of sales were to be donated to the Trevor Project. It was later confirmed the song is the lead single from Newell's debut album, to be released later in 2016.

In July 2016, Newell has provided backing vocals in their biggest collaboration yet in charitable single "Hands". The song itself was written by Justin Tranter, Julia Michaels and BloodPop and produced by Tranter himself and BloodPop, as well as Mark Ronson. It features the likes of Britney Spears, Gwen Stefani, Meghan Trainor, Troye Sivan, Selena Gomez, Kacey Musgraves, Mary J. Blige, Jason Derulo, Imagine Dragons, Jennifer Lopez, Adam Lambert, Tyler Glenn, P!NK, MNEK, RuPaul, Mary Lambert and Nate Ruess.

In 2017, Newell made their Broadway debut playing the role of Asaka in the revival of Once on This Island. In preparation, they began training with NYC voice teacher Mike Ruckles. In terms of music, Newell has also marked their return as a featured artist on the song "Other Side of Love" by house musician Kokiri.

They currently appear on NBC's musical dramedy Zoey's Extraordinary Playlist in the role of Mo, a genderfluid DJ and the protagonist's next-door neighbor.

Other work and awards
Newell played the title role in NBC's comedy pilot Imaginary Friend, which was expected to air in 2016. It was passed on and no other network wanted to make it into a series. They contributed with music to the HBO TV series Vinyl on a track also featuring DJ Cassidy and Jess Glynne.

They are committed to helping other LGBT youth and regularly performs at benefit concerts, most notably for The Trevor Project, the Human Rights Campaign, Jack Antonoff's Ally Coalition and other fundraisers.

Newell was given a special recognition award at the 2015 GLAAD Media Awards.

Personal life 
Newell identifies as gender nonconforming, and in May 2020 said they relate to their character Mo in Zoey's Extraordinary Playlist, who is genderfluid. They have stated they go by all pronouns. Newell also identifies as a gay man.

Discography

EPs

Singles

As lead artist

Featured appearances

Soundtrack appearances
Glee: The Music, The Christmas Album Volume 2 (2011)
Glee: The Music, The Complete Season 3 (2012)
Britney 2.0 (2012)
Glee: The Music Presents Glease (2012)
Glee: The Music, The Complete Season 4 (2013)
Glee Sings the Beatles (2013)
A Katy or a Gaga (Music from the Episode) (2013)
Glee: The Music, The Christmas Album Volume 4 (2013)
Glee: The Music, City of Angels (2013)
Glee: The Music, Transitioning (2014)
Polkadots: The Cool Kids Musical (World Premiere Cast Recording) (2016)
Once On This Island (New Broadway Cast Recording) (2018)
Zoey's Extraordinary Playlist: Season 1, Episode 4 (Music From the Original TV Series) (2020)
Zoey's Extraordinary Playlist: Season 1, Episode 7 (Music From the Original TV Series) (2020)
Zoey's Extraordinary Playlist: Season 1, Episode 11 (Music From the Original TV Series) (2020)
Zoey's Extraordinary Playlist: Season 1, Episode 12 (Music From the Original TV Series) (2020)

Filmography

Films and television

Theater

Awards and nominations

Notes

References

External links 

1992 births
Living people
21st-century American male actors
Actors from Lynn, Massachusetts
African-American male actors
American dance musicians
American male television actors
Bishop Fenwick High School (Peabody, Massachusetts) alumni
American gay actors
LGBT African Americans
LGBT people from Massachusetts
American LGBT singers
Male actors from Massachusetts
Participants in American reality television series
Singers from Massachusetts
21st-century African-American male singers
21st-century LGBT people